Il Puttino is a book published by Alessandro Salvio in 1634, full title:

IL PVTTINO
Altramente detto,
IL CAVALIERO ERRANTE
DEL SALVIO,
Sopra il gioco de'Scacchi, con la sua Apologia contra il Carrera, diuiso in tre Libri. IN NAPOLI, Nella Stampa di Gio: Domenico Montanaro. 1634. Con licenza de'Superiori.

In its closer sense, it is the second "book" (libro secondo), or second chapter of the first book (out of two) published in 1634 (see also "LIBRO QUARTO", fourth book, reprint of the "trattato" of 1604).

All these four books have been published as a reprint by an unknown author, "Da un Incognito", in 1723.

The latter work of 1723 is sometimes referred as The Salvio.

In its closest sense, however, 'Il Puttino' is a nickname used by Salvio for Giovanni Leonardo from Cutro. In the two version of the 'libro secondo' a story is told which actually took place 50–60 years before it was printed in letters. Although the descriptions of Alessandro Salvio should be considered with caution (due to the long distance of time), Il Puttino is very relevant for our imagination of these times. A long list of chess players are named in the Puttino, which obviously reflect real persons, such as

 Ruy Lopez
 Leonardo
 Puttino
 Paolo Boi
 Giulio Cesare da Lanciano

The first translation of Il Puttino (in the sense of the 'libro secondo') from Italian to English language was done by George Walker, and published unter the title "The light and lustre of chess" in The Chess player's chronicle, 1843.

According to JH Saratt's translation, Il Puttino was first published in 1604, and republished in 1634.

References

1634 books
17th century in chess
Chess books